Doner kebab (or), also spelled döner kebab, is a type of kebab, made of meat cooked on a vertical rotisserie. Seasoned meat stacked in the shape of an inverted cone is turned slowly on the rotisserie, next to a vertical cooking element. The operator uses a knife to slice thin shavings from the outer layer of the meat as it cooks. The vertical rotisserie was invented in the 19th-century Ottoman Empire, and dishes such as the Arab shawarma, Greek gyros, Canadian donair, and Mexican al pastor are derived from this. 

The modern sandwich variant of döner kebab originated and was popularized in 1970s West Berlin by Turkish immigrants. This was recognized by the  Berlin-based Association of Turkish Doner Manufacturers in Europe, in 2011. Nowadays there are more döner kebab stores in Berlin than in Istanbul.

The sliced meat of a doner kebab may be served on a plate with various accompaniments, stuffed into a pita or other type of bread as a sandwich, or wrapped in a thin flatbread such as lavash or yufka, known as a dürüm (literally meaning roll or wrap in Turkish). Kadir Nurman in the early 1970s introduced the sandwich or wrap form, which has become popular around the world as a fast food dish sold by kebab shops, and is often called simply a "kebab". The sandwich generally contains salad or vegetables, which may include tomato, lettuce, cabbage, onion with sumac, fresh or pickled cucumber, or chili, and various types of sauces.

History 

In the Ottoman Empire, at least as far back as the 17th century, stacks of seasoned sliced meat were cooked on a horizontal rotisserie, similar to the cağ kebab. The vertical rotisserie was introduced no later than the mid-19th century. The town of Bursa, in modern-day Turkey, is often considered the birthplace of the vertically roasted döner kebab. According to Yavuz İskenderoğlu, his grandfather İskender Efendi as a child in 1850s Bursa had the idea of roasting the lamb at his father's restaurant vertically rather than horizontally; it was a success, and some years later became known as döner kebap.  However, he may have been preceded by Hamdi Usta from Kastamonu around 1830.

A version popular in the Arab world became known as shawarma. By at least the 1930s it had been brought overseas, and was sold in restaurants in Mexico by Lebanese immigrants. Doner kebab likely arrived in Greece in the 1920s with the population exchange between Greece and Turkey, later transforming into gyros.

It was not until a century after its invention that döner kebab was introduced and popularized in Istanbul, most famously by Beyti Güler. His restaurant, first opened in 1945, was soon discovered by journalists and began serving döner and other kebab dishes to kings, prime ministers, film stars and celebrities. It has been sold in sandwich form in Istanbul since at least the mid-1960s.

The döner kebab and its derivatives served in a sandwich form as "fast food" came to worldwide prominence in the mid to late 20th century. The first doner kebab shop in London opened in 1966 and they were a familiar sight in provincial cities by the late 1970s, while gyros was already popular in Greece and New York City in 1971. A Greek-Canadian variation, the donair, was introduced in 1972, eventually becoming the official food of Halifax, and spreading across the country. By the 1960s, the taco al pastor in Mexico had evolved from the shawarma.

In Germany, the döner kebab was popularized by Turkish guest workers in Berlin in the early 1970s. The dish developed there from its original form into a distinctive style of sandwich with abundant salad, vegetables, and sauces, sold in large portions at affordable prices, that would soon become one of the top-selling fast food and street food dishes in Germany and much of Europe, and popular around the world.

Etymology 
In the English name "", the word doner is borrowed from the Turkish , with the Turkish letter ö usually anglicized as "o", though "döner kebab" is an alternative spelling in English. While kebab has been used in English since the late 17th century, doner/döner kebab is known only from the mid-20th or later. The Turkish word  comes from dönmek ("to turn" or "to rotate"), so the Turkish name  literally means "rotating roast". In German, it is spelled Döner Kebab; the sandwich is often called ein Döner. Particularly in British English, a döner kebab sandwich may be referred to simply as "a kebab". A Canadian variation is "donair". The Arabic name  (shāwarmā) derives from another Turkish word, also meaning "turning". Persians refer to it as "kebab torki".

Döner in Turkey 

There are many variations of döner in Turkey:
 Porsiyon ("portion", döner on a slightly heated plate, sometimes with a few grilled peppers or broiled tomatoes on the side)
 Pilavüstü ("over rice", döner served on a base of pilaf rice)
 İskender (specialty of Bursa, served in an oblong plate, atop a base of pide (thin flatbread similar to pita), with a dash of pepper or tomato sauce and boiling fresh butter) "Kebapçı İskender" is trademarked by Yavuz İskenderoğlu, whose family still runs the restaurant in Bursa.
 Dürüm, wrapped in a thin lavaş that is sometimes also grilled after being rolled, to make it crispier. It has two main variants in mainland Turkey:
 Soslu dürüm or SSK (sos, soğan, kaşar; in English: sauce, onion, cheese) (specialty of Ankara, contains İskender kebap sauce, making it juicier)
 Kaşarlı dürüm döner (speciality of Istanbul, grated kaşar cheese is put in the wrap which is then toasted to melt the cheese and crisp up the lavaş)
 Tombik or gobit (literally "the chubby", döner in a bun-shaped pita, with crispy crust and soft inside, and generally less meat than a dürüm)
 Ekmekarası ("between bread", generally the most filling version, consisting of a whole (or a half) regular Turkish bread filled with döner)

Regional variations

Caucasus, Middle East and Asia

Azerbaijan 

Japan 

In Japan, döner kebabs are now common, especially in Tokyo. They are predominantly made of chicken but occasionally beef, and called simply "kebab". The toppings include shredded lettuce or cabbage, sliced tomato, and usually a choice of sauces such as Thousand Islands, spicy, and garlic.

Vietnam 

Döner kebab is increasingly becoming popular in Vietnam, mostly because of Vietnamese who used to live in Germany and introduced it to their homeland. Throughout Hanoi and Ho Chi Minh City many döner kebab stalls can be found. Bánh mỳ Döner Kebab, the Vietnamese version of the döner kebab, has some fundamental differences with the original döner kebab. First of all, pork is used instead of beef and lamb. Second, the meat is topped with sour vegetables and chili sauce.

Europe

Austria 

Döner kebab shops can be found in all cities across Austria. Kebabs (often referred to as "Döner") outsell burgers or the traditional Würstel (sausage).

Finland 

In Finland, döner kebabs gained popularity after the 90s, when Turkish and other Near Eastern immigrants started to arrive in the country in considerable numbers, opening restaurants and importing their traditional dishes. Kebabs are generally seen as fast food, often served by late-night pizzerias.

France 
Turkish immigrants also brought doner kebab to France, where it became especially popular with the country's large North African population, in the 1980s. A typical kebab consists of bread stuffed with döner meat shavings, lettuce, sliced tomato and onions, with a choice of sauce including sauce blanche, a mayo-yogurt sauce. Kebabs are usually served with french fries, often stuffed into the bread itself. In Paris, this variation is called Sandwich grec ("Greek sandwich"). Doner kebab is the third most popular fast food in France, next to hamburgers and pizza, with more than 10,000 kebab shops selling about 300 million a year.

Germany 

In Germany, the earliest claim to the introduction of Turkish döner kebab dates to 1969, when Bursa native Nevzat Salim and his father started to sell the Iskender Kebap in Reutlingen. However, the Association of Turkish Döner Producers in Europe (ATDID) connects the wide popularization of the dish to the stand of Turkish guest worker Kadir Nurman at West Berlin's Zoo Station in 1972, which helped establish the döner kebab sandwich as a fast food option. While the claims of multiple persons to have "invented" the döner may be hard to prove, the further development of modern döner sandwich is connected to the city of Berlin.

The döner kebap as it was first served in Berlin contained only meat, onions and a bit of salad. Over time, it developed into a dish with abundant salad, vegetables, and a selection of sauces to choose from. Even orders placed in the Turkish language in Berlin will ask for the hot sauce using the German word "scharf", flagging the hybrid nature of the Berlin style of döner kebap. This variation served with pita bread has influenced the style of döner kebap in Germany and in other nations. A 2007 survey showed that many people consider the döner kebab to be the most characteristic food of Berlin.

Annual sales of döner kebabs in Germany amounted to €2.5 billion in 2010. Beef or veal, and chicken, are widely used instead of the more expensive lamb. Turkey ("Truthahn") and vegetarian versions are becoming increasingly popular.

Tarkan Taşyumruk, president of the Association of Turkish Döner Producers in Europe (ATDID), provided information in 2010 that, every day, more than 400 tonnes of döner kebab meat is produced in Germany by around 350 firms. At the same ATDID fair, Taşyumruk stated that, "Annual sales in Germany amount to €2.5 billion. That shows we are one of the biggest fast-foods in Germany." In many cities throughout Germany, döner kebabs are at least as popular as hamburgers or sausages, especially with young people.

In 2011 there were over 16,000 establishments selling döner kebabs in Germany, with yearly sales of €3.5 billion.

Netherlands 
Kapsalon is a Dutch food item consisting of French fries topped with döner or shawarma meat, garlic sauce, and a layer of Gouda cheese, baked or broiled until melted, and then subsequently covered with a layer of dressed salad greens and more sauce. The dish is usually served as fast food in a disposable metal tray. The term kapsalon means "hairdressing salon" or "barbershop" in Dutch, alluding to hairdresser Nathaniel Gomes who originated the dish when he requested his local kebab shop in Rotterdam to prepare it for him.

United Kingdom 
Introduced by Turkish immigrants, the döner kebab with salad and sauce is a very popular dish in the United Kingdom, especially after a night out. The meat is sometimes sold on its own, but more commonly with chips (fries), in naan bread or in pitta bread. German Doner Kebab is a Glasgow-based chain operating 100 restaurants in the UK, which specialises in the dish.

Americas

Canada 

A variation known as donair was introduced in Halifax, Nova Scotia, in the early 1970s. There are competing claims about the origin, but according to Halifax resident Leo Gamoulakos, his father, Greek immigrant Peter Gamoulakos, started selling Greek-style gyros at Velos Pizza in the Halifax suburb of Bedford. It did not catch on with the public, so in 1972 he modified the customary pork and lamb recipe by using spiced ground beef, Lebanese flatbread, and inventing the distinctive sweet donair sauce made with condensed milk, vinegar, sugar, and garlic. He called it by the doner name rather than gyros, but it came to be pronounced, and spelled, as donair. In 1973 Gamoulakos opened the first King of Donair restaurant on Quinpool Road in Halifax. In 2015, Halifax named donair the city's official food. Historically found only in Atlantic Canada, the dish's popularity has expanded to other parts of Canada.

Mexico 
Al pastor is a variation of döner kebab via Lebanese shawarma. Literally "in the style of the shepherd", it references the lamb often used in shawarma, though it is normally made with pork.

United States 

Doner kebab is best known in the United States in its Greek variation, now known as gyros. Numerous people have made competing claims to have introduced the dish sometime in the 1960s, and its mass-production in the 1970s. It was also available, possibly later, in some Turkish restaurants. In recent years a number of restaurants and food trucks specializing in döner kebab have opened in various parts of the country; a substantial percentage are owned by German immigrants.

Oceania

Australia 

With a multicultural population, the doner kebab in Australia competes with the Greek gyros and the Lebanese shawarma. Kebab sellers are subject to strict government food safety regulations.

A halal snack pack is a dish that originated in Australia. It consists of halal-certified doner kebab meat, chips (french fries), and sauces such as chili, garlic and barbecue. It is traditionally served in a styrofoam container, and has been described as a staple dish of takeaway kebab shops in Australia. The name of the dish was selected by the Macquarie Dictionary as the "People's choice Word of the Year" for 2016.

Health concerns 
Health concerns regarding döner kebab, including the hygiene involved in overnight storage and re-heating of partially cooked meat, its quality, as well as high salt, fat, and calorie levels, have been reported in the media. Some investigations have found poor-quality ingredients in döner kebab meat, or meat types other than what was advertised. Food safety regulations in most developed countries address the dangers of bacteria in undercooked meat of all kinds sold to the public. Some have guidelines specific to döner kebab handling and preparation. Following several outbreaks of E. coli food poisoning, the Canadian government in 2008 introduced a number of recommendations, including that the meat should be cooked a second time after being sliced from the rotisserie. In Germany, any döner kebab meat placed onto the rotisserie must be sold the same day. It is a violation of health regulations to freeze partially cooked meat for sale at a later date.

See also 
 List of kebabs
 List of spit-roasted foods

References

Further reading 
 
 , Aufgespießt. Wie der Döner über die Deutschen kam, 1996, 
 Maren Möhring, "Döner kebab and West German Consumer (Multi-)Cultures", in Ulrike Lindner, et al., eds., Hybrid Cultures—Nervous States, 2010, p. 151-167

Fast food
German sandwiches
Hot sandwiches
Meat dishes
Mediterranean cuisine
Middle Eastern grilled meats
Sandwiches
Skewered kebabs
Spit-cooked foods
Street food
Turkish sandwiches